The Craftory is a British-American venture capital fund headquartered in Piccadilly, London, and also based in San Francisco. Launched in early 2018 by Ernesto Schmitt and Elio Leoni Sceti as an alternative to traditional venture capital, it focuses on cause-driven investment in the consumer goods sector, investing in companies that positively impact the categories they serve. As of 2022, The Craftory has more than $600 million in permanent, early stage and growth capital (Series A, Series B etc.) to back 'challenger brands'. The company is the first UK based B Corp fund, and in 2020 Forbes characterised the company as investing in companies 'disrupting the planet for good'.

History 
The Craftory was founded in 2018 by Elio Leoni Sceti, who was formerly head of the Iglo Group and music publisher EMI, and Ernesto Schmitt – a serial entrepreneur (Beamly, DriveTribe, Fabula AI).

The Craftory's initial focus was specifically investing in new, digitally-activated consumer goods brands. It aimed to remove traditional advertising, instead utilising brand storytelling and digital marketing as a means for brand growth.

In 2018, early investors in The Craftory included Spice Private Equity & GP Investments, who invested $60 million in May 2018. The remainder of the early capital coming from private wealth.

Focus
The current fund size is $600 million in permanent capital, and only invests in ‘Challenger Brands’. These are primarily backed at early and growth stage (Series A, Series B etc.)

The fund actively invests in up to 10 challenger brands with annual revenues of more than $10m, in various consumer sectors including beauty, health, food, household and personal care.

The Craftory has made several investments to date, including $18 million into now unicorn NotCo, the Chilean plant based food company. $18 million into gender neutral underwear apparel TomboyX. $16 million into sustainable detergent pod maker Dropps. $20 million into Present Life. $20 million into sustainable diaper brand Dyper and $22 million into natural dog-food brand Edgard & Cooper.

People 

The Craftory was founded in 2018 by Ernesto Schmitt and Elio Leoni Sceti.

The fund's board includes Belgian financier and hedge fund manager Pierre Lagrange, and the Brazilian Chairman of GP Investments, Fersen Lambranho.

The founding team included senior partner Thiago Rodrigues, who was former Managing Director of GP Investments.

In 2018, Jon Lunetta joined as US Craft Partner. Other Craft Partners include Jamie Swango, formerly CMO at Deliveroo, Jonathan Miller, JP Thurlow (published in Elle and Vogue), Simon David Miller (BAFTA nominated filmmaker) and Atkins Dondo.

References

Investment management companies of the United Kingdom
Venture capital firms of the United Kingdom
Private equity firms of the United Kingdom
Companies based in London